Chehel Cheshmeh-ye Gharbi Rural District is a rural district (dehestan) in Sarshiv District, Saqqez County, Kurdistan Province, Iran. At the 2006 census, its population was 2,624, in 468 families. The rural district has 9 villages.

References 

Rural Districts of Kurdistan Province
Saqqez County